Prelude in C major may refer to:

 Prelude in C major, Op. 11, No. 1, by Alexander Scriabin
 Prelude in C major, by Johann Sebastian Bach, from the Prelude and Fugue in C major, BWV 846, from Book I of The Well-Tempered Clavier

See also 
 Prelude in C (disambiguation)